Rabbi Shimon ben Halafta was a rabbi who lived in the 2nd century CE (fourth generation of tannaim).

His life
Little is known of his life, but a number of stories are recorded involving him, often involving miracles.

He was the brother of R' Jose ben Halafta and the son of R' Halafta. He lived in Ein Teenah, which some identify with modern-day עין תינה in the Golan Heights.

He was obese. Once on a hot day, he asked his daughter to fan him, offering to pay her for this service with packages of nard spices. Suddenly the wind blew, and he exclaimed, "How many packages of nard do I owe to the master of the wind (God)?"

He was extremely poor. It is said that once he did not have money for Shabbat expenses, and upon praying he was miraculously given a precious stone. However, his wife refused to use the stone, so as not to have his reward in this world detract from his reward in the world to come. He prayed again, and the stone was miraculously taken back.

It is reported that once he was confronted by lions while traveling. He prayed, and two cuts of meat miraculously descended from heaven. The lions ate one, allowing him to escape. He took the second cut to the beit midrash, where it was ruled kosher to eat.

He was known as the "researcher of matters", and would perform various experiments to understand nature better. He once performed an experiment to determine the social patterns of ants, but a later rabbi, Rav Aha b. Rava, criticized its methodology.

He is said to be buried in the old cemetery in Tzfat.

Teachings
He is known for his aggadic teachings, particularly those regarding the value of peace.

Quotes
 The Holy One - blessed be He - found no better vessel in which to hold blessing for Israel than peace.
 Great is peace, for when the Holy One - blessed be He - created His world, He made peace between the upper and the lower world... On the second day He created from the upper world... on the third day He created from the lower world... on the fourth day from the upper world... on the fifth day from the lower world... On the sixth day He came to create man. He said: If I create him from the upper world, the upper world will have one more creation than the lower world; if I create him from the lower world, the lower world will have one more creation than the upper world. What did He do? He created him from the upper world and the lower world. As it says: "The Lord God fashioned man dust from the earth" - from the lower world; "and blew in his nose the breath of life" - from the upper world.

References

Mishnah rabbis
2nd-century rabbis